The Navistar 7000 series is a line of military heavy lift vehicles based on Navistar International's WorkStar truck chassis, and produced by Navistar Defense.  The truck is available in a variety of wheel (4×2, 4×4, 6×4, and 6×6) and engine configurations.

In 2005, the US Army ordered 2,900 7000-MV Series for the Afghan National Army and Iraqi Ministry of Defense and an additional order of 7,000 was added in 2008.

The Canadian Army had adopted the Navistar Defence LLC Medium Logistics truck. The vehicle fulfills the MSVS MilCOTS (Militarized Commercial-Off-The-Shelf) requirement. As of mid-July 2015, the MSVS SMP (Standard Military Pattern) vehicle had been chosen. Starting in June 2010, 1,300 Navistar units replaced part of the MLVW fleet. The civilian designation of the 7000-MV is Navistar 7400 SFA 6×6 and International WorkStar.

In July 2012, the order for 1500 MSVS SMP trucks was cancelled and re-evaluated.  In July 2015, Canada awarded the SMP contract to Mack Trucks instead. Mack began delivery of Kerax-series trucks in 2017 and completed delivery by the end of 2018.

Operators

 Afghan National Army
 Afghan National Police

 Bulgarian Air Force — 1+ Navistar 7000-MV in service in fuel tanker configuration at Graf Ignatievo Air Base.

Canadian Army Reserve — 1,300 Navistar 7400 SFA in service.

Colombian Marine Corps — 47+ Navistar 7000-MV in service.
Colombian Navy — 8 donated by the US in November 2017.

 Iraqi Armed Forces — 115 Navistar 7000-MV on order in addition to unknown number in service.

 Jordanian Armed Forces

 Kyrgyz Armed Forces

 Republic of China Army
 Republic of China Marine Corps

 Peruvian Army

Failed Bids

References

External links

 Navistar Defense

Military trucks of the United States